Pumphonia is the debut album by Italian electronic musicians Benassi Bros., released in 2004. The group consists of cousins Alle and Benny Benassi.

Track listing

External links
 

2004 albums
Benassi Bros. albums
Benny Benassi albums